Oruaiti is a locality in Northland, New Zealand. It lies on state highway 10. Mangonui lies to the west, and Whangaroa Harbour to the east.

The New Zealand Ministry for Culture and Heritage gives a translation of "place of [a] small pit" for Ōruaiti.

Demographics

Taemaro-Oruaiti had a population of 867 at the 2018 New Zealand census, an increase of 201 people (30.2%) since the 2013 census, and an increase of 138 people (18.9%) since the 2006 census. There were 276 households, comprising 459 males and 411 females, giving a sex ratio of 1.12 males per female. The median age was 49.1 years (compared with 37.4 years nationally), with 156 people (18.0%) aged under 15 years, 117 (13.5%) aged 15 to 29, 426 (49.1%) aged 30 to 64, and 168 (19.4%) aged 65 or older.

Ethnicities were 75.8% European/Pākehā, 39.4% Māori, 2.1% Pacific peoples, 3.1% Asian, and 1.7% other ethnicities. People may identify with more than one ethnicity.

The percentage of people born overseas was 12.1, compared with 27.1% nationally.

Of those people who chose to answer the census's question about religious affiliation, 53.6% had no religion, 34.6% were Christian, 1.7% had Māori religious beliefs, 0.3% were Hindu, 0.7% were Buddhist and 1.7% had other religions.

Of those at least 15 years old, 93 (13.1%) people had a bachelor's or higher degree, and 147 (20.7%) people had no formal qualifications. The median income was $19,900, compared with $31,800 nationally. 54 people (7.6%) earned over $70,000 compared to 17.2% nationally. The employment status of those at least 15 was that 237 (33.3%) people were employed full-time, 126 (17.7%) were part-time, and 48 (6.8%) were unemployed.

Education
Oruaiti School is a coeducational full primary (years 1-8) school with a roll of  students as of  The school started in 1896. In the 1950s and early 1960s, it became an experimental school under principal Elwyn Richardson.

Notes

External links
 Oruaiti School website

Far North District
Populated places in the Northland Region